Coalport East was a London and North Western Railway station at Coalport, situated on the north bank of the River Severn. It formed the terminus of the Coalport Branch Line which ran from Hadley Junction near Oakengates on the LNWR Stafford to Shrewsbury Line.

History
The station was originally named ‘Coalport’ at opening on 10 June 1861. It was later renamed ‘Coalport East’ to avoid confusion with the Severn Valley Railway Coalport station which opened on the opposite bank of the river Severn in 1862.

The station was host to a LMS caravan from 1934 to 1939.

Coalport East closed to passengers on 2 June 1952, and to freight traffic in 1960.

References
Notes

Further reading

Disused railway stations in Shropshire
Former London and North Western Railway stations
Railway stations in Great Britain closed in 1952
Railway stations in Great Britain opened in 1861
1861 establishments in England